Nanaloricus is a genus of Loriciferan, the first to be described.

References 

Loricifera
Protostome genera